Walter Murray Collegiate, also known as WMCI, is a high school serving grades 9 to 12, located in south-eastern Saskatoon, Saskatchewan. This public secondary school was established in 1961 and is supported by the infrastructure of the Nutana Suburban Centre, a part of the Nutana Suburban Development Area. This school falls under the jurisdiction of the Saskatoon Public School Division.

The school is named after Walter Charles Murray, the first president of the University of Saskatchewan. It is one of two Saskatoon high schools to offer the SAGE program (the other is Bedford Road Collegiate) for gifted students, and one of many with a full French Immersion program. WMCI has a technology wing that offers mechanics, welding, electronics, wood-working, machining, and photography/graphic arts to its students. WMC also offers courses to those learning English as a second language.

As well, Walter Murray offers many successful athletic programs, such as its cross country team, which is a 14 consecutive time defending city championship-winning team, wrestling team, whose girls won cities in 2007 and boys were runners-up, as well as their football program, where Walter Murray had made it to the city final 3 of the past 8 years and their junior football team, who sported the only undefeated record in the city.  Recently, they added a hockey program to their list of athletic programs.

Currently its feeder schools are Alvin Buckwold School, Brevoort Park School, Brunskill School, Chief Whitecap School, Colette Bourgonje School, Greystone Heights School, Holliston School, Hugh Cairns, V. C. School, Lakeridge School, Lakeview School, Prince Philip School and Wildwood School.

Notable alumni 
 Don Atchison, former Mayor of Saskatoon (2003-2016)
 Pat Atkinson, former Saskatchewan Legislative Assembly member
 Ryan Bayda, former NHL player
 Graeme Bell, former CFL player
 Mitch Clarke, former wrestler; professional mixed martial artist in the Ultimate Fighting Championship
 Wendel Clark, former NHL player
 Eric Cline, former Saskatchewan Legislative Assembly member
 Nate Glubish, Alberta Legislative Assembly member
 Mike Green, former NHL player
 Dave King, former Team Canada hockey coach
 Gene Makowsky, former CFL player; Saskatchewan Legislative Assembly member
 Keith Morrison, journalist and broadcaster

References

External links

 Walter Murray Homepage
 Saskatoon Public Schools

High schools in Saskatoon
Educational institutions established in 1961
1961 establishments in Saskatchewan